The Inner Cage is a 2021 Italian-Swiss drama film co-written and directed by  Leonardo Di Costanzo.

The film premiered out of competition at the 78th Venice International Film Festival. The film won two David di Donatello Awards, for best original screenplay and for best actor (Silvio Orlando).

Plot
An old prison built in the 19th century, located in a remote and unspecified part of the Italian territory, is being decommissioned. As a result of bureaucratic holdups the transfers have been blocked and a dozen inmates are left, along with a few guards, waiting to be sent to new destinations.

Distribution 
After being presented out of competition at the Venice exhibition, the film was distributed in Italian cinemas starting from 14 October 2021.

Cast 

 Toni Servillo: Gaetano Gargiulo
 Silvio Orlando: Carmine Lagioia
 Fabrizio Ferracane: Franco Coletti
 Salvatore Striano: Cacace
 Roberto De Francesco: Buonocore

References

External links

2021 drama films
Italian drama films 
Swiss drama films 
2020s Italian-language films
2020s Italian films